Martha (Stone) Palmer is an American computer scientist. She is best known for her work on verb semantics, and for the creation of ontological resources such as PropBank and VerbNet.

Education 

Palmer received a Master of Arts in Computer Science from University of Texas at Austin in 1976, advised by Robert Simmons.

She received her PhD from the University of Edinburgh in 1985. Her thesis was titled "Driving semantics for a limited domain", and was advised by Alan Bundy.

Career 

Palmer is currently a professor of computer science and linguistics at the University of Colorado Boulder. She was previously on the faculty of the University of Pennsylvania.

Awards and honors 

Palmer served as president of the Association for Computational Linguistics in 2005 and was named an ACL Fellow in 2014 "for significant contributions to computational semantics and the development of semantic corpora".

In 2017, she was awarded the Helen & Hubert Croft Professorship by the University of Colorado. In the same year, the university named her a "Professor of Distinction", a title reserved for professors who have received international recognition for their research.

References

External links
Martha Palmer's home page

Year of birth missing (living people)
Living people
American computer scientists
Fellows of the Association for Computational Linguistics
University of Colorado Boulder faculty
University of Pennsylvania faculty
Alumni of the University of Edinburgh
American expatriates in Scotland
University of Texas at Austin alumni
American women computer scientists
Computational linguistics researchers
Natural language processing researchers
American women academics
21st-century American women
Presidents of the Association for Computational Linguistics